Jeffrey Faris (born March 13, 1990) is an American football coach who is currently the tight ends coach at the University of California, Los Angeles. He played college football at Duke, where he had spent the entirety of his coaching career before coming to UCLA.

Playing career 
Faris was a three-year safety at Duke who did not see much playing time, redshirting his true freshman season and appearing in one game each in his freshman and sophomore season.

Coaching career

Duke 
After graduating with a degree in economics in 2011, Faris was a graduate assistant at Duke, during which he earned his master's in economics and Christian studies. He was promoted to wide receivers coach in 2014 after offensive coordinator Kurt Roper left the program and Scottie Montgomery was promoted to offensive coordinator. He added offensive recruiting coordinator duties in 2017 and was reassigned to tight ends coach in 2018. He was named the Division I FBS recipient of the AFCA Assistant Coach of the Year in 2018, an award given to the assistant coach who "excels in community service, commitment to the student-athlete, on-field coaching success, and AFCA professional organization involvement."

Faris was promoted to co-offensive coordinator in 2021 in a series of staff changes made by David Cutcliffe. In addition to the promotion, he was shifted to quarterbacks coach and was also named the primary offensive play-caller.

UCLA 

On January 19, 2022, Faris was announced as the new tight ends coach at UCLA.

References

External links 
 
 Duke Blue Devils coaching profile
 Duke Blue Devils player profile

1990 births
Living people
Sportspeople from Knoxville, Tennessee
Players of American football from Knoxville, Tennessee
Coaches of American football from Tennessee
American football safeties
Duke Blue Devils football players
Duke Blue Devils football coaches
UCLA Bruins football coaches